DAAR Communications plc is an independent privately owned broadcasting organization in Nigeria. It was established on 31 August 1998, by Raymond Dokpesi. On 23 April 2007, it was converted into a public liability company. 
It pioneered Africa Independent Television (AIT), Ray power 100.5 FM Abuja and Raypower 100.5 FM.
The company is listed on the Nigerian Stock Exchange.

The DAAR communication Plc was penalized with a fine of ₦500,000 in July 2018 with two weeks optimum. The fine was imposed by the National Broadcasting Commission as a result of alleged infringement on the provisions of the Nigeria Broadcasting Code. The Director-General of NBC, Mallam Is’haq Modibbo Kawu, claimed that the fine was imposed "following the persistent and flagrant infringement of the provisions of the Nigeria Broadcasting Code through the use of provocative, inflammatory and divisive comments by anchors on the Raypower programme, Political platform".

References

Companies listed on the Nigerian Stock Exchange